E29 may refer to:
 European route E29
 HMS E29
 E29 screw, a type of Edison screw
  Seremban–Port Dickson Highway
 Harima Expressway and Tottori Expressway, route E29 in Japan